Zero width (also zero-width) refers to a non-printing character used in computer typesetting of some complex scripts:
Zero-width joiner
Zero-width non-joiner
Zero-width space
Zero-width no-break space